The Ruins of Adventure is the 49th album by avant-folk/blues singer/songwriter Jandek, the 45th 'studio' album released by Corwood Industries around December 2006 (#0787). The photograph used for the album's front cover appears to be the same one used for Jandek's previous release What Else Does The Time Mean?, only instead cropped to the man's face.

Notes
After a few consecutive live releases, this album finds the artist back in a good sounding studio playing solo fretless bass and vocals. In contrast with the more expansive live work that had been recently released, this album was denser, with long songs describing a man building a park that nobody else could go to ("The Park") to extremely harsh blasts at various individuals, finishing with the declaration that he will "not fall into your stinking hole." It is closer in sound to such studio albums as Shadow of Leaves, though the bass work here is somewhat different, more languid than before. Vocally the album toys with several singing styles, including a howling blues vocal but also a more spoken voice that sets up long runs of image-filled lyrics.

Track listing

References

2006 albums
Jandek albums
Corwood Industries albums